Norah Geddes (1887–1967) was a Scottish landscape designer.

Early life and education
Geddes was born in 1887. Her parents were Sir Patrick Geddes and Lady Anna Geddes. Her childhood is described as "unconventional and peripatetic" and lacking conventional schooling in The New Biographical Dictionary of Scottish Women. She attended her father's botany course at the University of Dundee when she was just 14 before moving to the Edinburgh College of Art for drawing lessons.

Career
Both her parents worked extensively to improve conditions for the poor, and so Norah's first endeavour was to provide window box planting. She took a leading role in her father's Open Spaces project, which aimed to revive derelict urban plots with gardens and play areas. In 1908, the group carried out a survey to locate sites within the city that could be used to provide outdoor recreation areas for the local residents and their children. In 1909, she opened White Hart Garden below Johnstone Gardens – the first in a series of spaces brought back to life by her designs.

Geddes joined her father's Open Spaces Committee at the Outlook Tower and Camera Obscurer but was left frustrated with her scope of work in the role. Initially she contributed significantly to the planning and layout of the Royal Zoological Society Scotland Garden. It was inspired by zoos in Hamburg and New York, which moved away from the caged menageries of the Victorian era and instead promoted large open enclosures and naturalistic settings. It had pet corners and promoted opportunities for education. Her part in this was overshadowed by those of her husband and her father.

Geddes has been described as "One of the early pioneers of creating green spaces in an urban environment for the benefit for the local community. Norah's work 110 years ago is still incredibly important today."

Personal life
Geddes met her husband Frank Mears in 1913. The couple lived in Ramsay Garden. Once married their eldest son, Kenneth, was born the following year; Alastair in 1918, and John two years later. Geddes's landscape gardening career was effectively over.

Notable works 
 The Royal Zoological Society Scotland Garden
 Chessel's Court, Edinburgh
 Johnstone Terrace, Edinburgh
 The West Port Garden, Edinburgh
 A number of playgrounds in Dublin

References 

1887 births
1967 deaths
Date of birth unknown
Date of death unknown
Artists from Edinburgh
Scottish landscape architects
Women landscape architects
Alumni of the University of Dundee
Scottish watercolourists